The Chesed-El Synagogue ("Grace of God") is a synagogue in Singapore. The synagogue was constructed in 1905 and is located at Oxley Rise in River Valley, within the Central Area of Singapore.

On 18 December 1998, it was designated as a national monument of Singapore.

History
The Chesed-El Synagogue was designated as a national monument on 18 December 1998.

The synagogue underwent an extensive renovation in 2016 with the support of the National Heritage Board (NHB) of Singapore.

A Jewish Community Centre was built on the Synagogue grounds, where the communal Sukkah used to stand. In 2019, the synagogue received its fourth grant from the restoration fund of the NHB for restoration and maintenance of the building.

See also
 History of the Jews in Singapore

References 

Lee Geok Boi (2004), The Religious Monuments of Singapore, Landmark Books, 
Preservation of Monuments Board, Know Our Monuments

External links

Virtual Jewish History Tour of Singapore, Jewish Virtual Library
Singaporejews.com: The Jewish Community of Singapore

Synagogues in Singapore
River Valley, Singapore
National monuments of Singapore
Sephardi synagogues
Sephardi Jewish culture in Asia
Landmarks in Singapore
1905 establishments in Singapore
Synagogues completed in 1905
Renaissance Revival synagogues
20th-century architecture in Singapore